Yakup Kadri Karaosmanoğlu (also rendered Yakub Kadri; ; 27 March 1889 – 13 December 1974) was a Turkish novelist, journalist, diplomat, and member of parliament.

Biography
Yakup Kadri Karaosmanoğlu, was born in Cairo on 27 March 1889.  He was the son of Abdülkadir Bey, a member of the Karaosmanoğlu family which started to gain a reputation in the 17th century around the Manisa region.  His mother was İkbal Hanım, a woman in İsmail Paşa's palace community.  Until the age of six, he was raised in Cairo, after which his family moved to their homeland, Manisa.  He completed his primary education in Manisa, and in 1903, the family moved to İzmir.

Karaosmanoğlu was one of the contributors of İkdam during the Turkish War of Independence and after the establishment of the Republic of Turkey in 1923, a representative of Manisa to the Grand National Assembly from 1931 to 1934. Karaosmanoğlu was the founding editor-in-chief of Tan newspaper which was launched in 1935 and served in the post until 1938. Then until 1955, he served as an ambassador of Turkey in various European and Middle Eastern capitals.

Following his return to Turkey, he served as the editor of Ulus in 1957.  In 1961, he was a representative of the constituent assembly of the National Unity Committee following the 1960 coup d'état. His last political position was again as a representative of Manisa to the Grand National Assembly from 1961 to 1965. In 1966, he was elected chairman of the Anadolu Agency.

Yakup Kadri Karaosmanoğlu died at the Gülhane Military Medical Academy in Ankara on 13 December 1974.

Works
Yakup Kadri's first work was published in 1913.  His novel Yaban (Stranger, 1932) depicts the bitter experiences of a Turkish intellectual, Ahmet Celal, in the countryside after losing his arm in the Battle of Gallipoli. Though categorized as naturalist, the novel has a romantic, anti-pastoral quality.

His novel Panorama analyzes the political, social, and economical changes during the transition period from the Ottoman Empire to the modern Republic of Turkey. It is considered to be a "generation novel" as the story is based on the lives of several generations of the same family during this transitional period.

He was one of the theorists of the Kadro movement and among the founders of Kadro magazine.

Personal life
Karaosmanoğlu married Ayşe Leman Karaosmanoğlu who was a daughter of Mehmed Asaf Paşa, an Ottoman pasha. Burhan Belge was Leman's brother, and her nephew is Turkish author Murat Belge.

Bibliography
 "Bir Serencam" (An Event or Result) (1913)  
 "Kiralık Konak" (The Rented Mansion) (1922)
 "Nur Baba" (Baba Nur) (1922)
 "Rahmet" (Mercy) (1923)
 "Hüküm Gecesi" (Night of Verdict) (1927) 
 "Sodom ve Gomore" (Sodom and Gomorrah) (1928)
 "Yaban" (A Wild One) (1932)  
 "Ankara" (1934)
 "Ahmet Haşim" (1934)
 "Bir Sürgün" (An Exile ) (1937)  
 "Atatürk" (1946)
 "Panorama 1" (1950)
 "Panorama 2" (1954)
 "Zoraki Diplomat" (Forced Diplomat) (1954) 
 "Hep O Şarkı" (Always The Same Song)([1956)
 "Anamın Kitabı" (The Book of My Mother) (1957)
 "Vatan Yolunda" (On The Path of the Nation (1958)
 "Politikada 45 Yıl" (1968)
 "Gençlik ve Edebiyat Hatıraları" (Memoirs of Youth and Literature) (1969)

References

External links

20th-century Turkish diplomats
Ulus (newspaper) people
20th-century Turkish journalists
20th-century Turkish male writers
1889 births
1974 deaths
Ambassadors of Turkey to Albania
Ambassadors of Turkey to Iran
Ambassadors of Turkey to the Czech Republic
Ambassadors of Turkey to the Netherlands
Ambassadors of Turkey to Switzerland
Deputies of Manisa
Deputies of Mardin
Istanbul University Faculty of Law alumni
Members of the Grand National Assembly of Turkey
Republican People's Party (Turkey) politicians
Turkish magazine founders
20th-century Turkish novelists